Amy Malek (born c. 1979/1980), is an American assistant professor, scholar, and sociocultural anthropologist. She serves as the endowed Chair and Director in Iranian and Persian Gulf Studies (IPGS) at Oklahoma State University, Stillwater. Her work focuses on the migration, citizenship, memory, and culture in the Iranian diaspora. Malek is an Iranian-American.

Education and career 

Malek has a bachelor's degree (2003) from Emory University; and a Master of Arts degree (2005) in Near Eastern studies from New York University. She holds a Ph.D. (2015) in anthropology at the University of California, Los Angeles (UCLA). While attending UCLA, she took an interest in studying the second generation of Iranian immigrants.

From 2016 to 2022, she was an assistant professor of international studies at the College of Charleston. From 2019 to 2021, Malek was an associate research scholar at Princeton University’s Sharmin and Bijan Mossavar-Rahmani Center for Iran and Persian Gulf Studies. In Fall of 2022, she joined Oklahoma State University, Stillwater.

Publications

See also 
 Iranian nationality law

References

External links 
 Official website
 Iranian and Persian Gulf Studies (IPGS) website
 

Date of birth missing (living people)
Living people
American Iranologists
American anthropologists
Emory University alumni
New York University alumni
University of California, Los Angeles alumni
College of Charleston faculty
Oklahoma State University faculty
American people of Iranian descent
Iranian diaspora studies scholars
Year of birth missing (living people)